Drums of the Congo is a 1942 American drama film, directed by Christy Cabanne. It stars Ona Munson, Stuart Erwin, and Peggy Moran, and was released on July 17, 1942.

Cast list
 Ona Munson as Dr. Ann Montgomery
 Stuart Erwin as Congo Jack
 Peggy Moran as Enid Waldron
 Don Terry as Capt. Kirk Armstrong
 Richard Lane as George Coutlass
 Jules Bledsoe as Kalu
 Turhan Bey as Juma
 Ernest Whitman as King Malaba
 Edwin Stanley as Col. S. C. Robinson
 Jess Lee Brooks as Chief Madjeduka

References

External links 
 
 
 

American drama films
1942 drama films
1942 films
Universal Pictures films
Films directed by Christy Cabanne
American black-and-white films
Films scored by Hans J. Salter
1940s American films